Saduria entomon  is a benthic isopod crustacean of the family Chaetiliidae. It is distributed along the coasts of the Arctic Ocean and of the northern Pacific Ocean. It is also found in the brackish Baltic Sea, where it is considered a glacial relict. Moreover, it is present in a number of North European lakes, including Ladoga, Vänern and Vättern. It has been introduced into the Black Sea.

Saduria entomon is one of the largest crustaceans in the Baltic Sea. S. entomon are sexually dimorphic, with males growing larger and maturing at larger sizes than females. Most individuals die after reproduction, and the species might be functionally semelparous, but it is probably capable of iteroparity. Its lifespan is 3 years, possibly much longer.

Saduria entomon is a predator that feeds on other benthic animals, such as Monoporeia affinis. It is also a scavenger and a cannibal.

References

Valvifera
Freshwater crustaceans of Europe
Crustaceans of the Atlantic Ocean
Fauna of the Baltic Sea
Crustaceans described in 1758
Taxa named by Carl Linnaeus